Sharon L. Gaetz is the first woman elected mayor of Chilliwack, British Columbia, Canada. She had previously served as acting mayor prior to being elected. Mayor Gaetz also served as director for the Fraser Valley Regional District. She was elected mayor during the 2008 British Columbia municipal elections. In 2018, she lost to incumbent city councilor Ken Popove whilst seeking a fourth term.

In 2007, then-Councillor Gaetz presented information about cannabis cultivation to Chilliwack's social issues advisory committee. Also that year, she supported the densification of the city through the construction of an apartment building containing 71 units.

Before entering politics, Mayor Gaetz was a pastor at the Southside Church in Chilliwack.

Family 
Gaetz and her husband, Jim, have a son, and two grandchildren.

References

Living people
Women municipal councillors in Canada
Women mayors of places in British Columbia
Women Christian clergy
Canadian Christian clergy
Mayors of Chilliwack
Year of birth missing (living people)